Cabot Tower may refer to one of two towers, both named after John Cabot:

Cabot Tower, Bristol in Bristol, England.
Cabot Tower (St. John's) in Newfoundland, Canada.

Buildings and structures disambiguation pages